KRLF (88.5 FM) is a radio station  broadcasting a Contemporary Christian format. Licensed to Pullman, Washington, United States, the station serves the Pullman-Moscow area.  The station is currently owned by Living Faith Fellowship Educational Ministries, under a non-commercial educational license, and features programming from Salem Communications.

References

External links

Contemporary Christian radio stations in the United States
Pullman, Washington
Radio stations established in 1974
RLF